Huejutla de Reyes is a city and one of the 84 municipalities of Hidalgo, in central-eastern Mexico. The name comes from the Nahuatl huexotl ("willow") and tlan ("place"), while "de Reyes" commemorates local cobbler Antonio Reyes Cabrera who died defending Huejutla from French invaders in 1866.

The municipality covers an area of 377.8 km2 in the northeast of Hidalgo, in the Huasteca region, on the border with the state of Veracruz. As of 2005, the municipality had a total population of 115,786. but only 36,305 live in the metropolitan area, whereas the remaining population live in various small communities. Around 73,200 people speak indigenous languages, primarily Huasteca Nahuatl.

It has been called "the Heart of La Huasteca".

Climate

Huejutla de Reyes has a tropical monsoon climate (Köppen Am) featuring short, but extremely hot springs and also short, warm winters with cool mornings. The average high temperature in June is 34.4 °C (93.9 °F), with an average minimum temperature in June of 21.5 °C (70.7 °F). The average high temperature in January is 24.5 °C (76.1 °F), with ana average minimum temperature in January of 11.5 °C (52.7 °F). The highest temperature ever recorded in Huejutla de Reyes is 50.0 °C (122 °F), recorded on April 26, 2017. A low temperature of -3.0 °C (26.6 °F) was recorded on December 14, 1997. Annual precipitation is 1,463.7 millimetres (57.626 in); July and September being the wettest months.

<div style="width:75%;">

Sister cities
  Brownsville, United States (2009)

References

Municipalities of Hidalgo (state)
Populated places in Hidalgo (state)
Nahua settlements